XHWO-FM 97.7/XEWO-AM 1020 is a combo radio station in Chetumal, Quintana Roo, Mexico. It is known as Sol Stereo.

History
XEWO received its first concession in March 1984. It became an FM combo in 1994.

References

Radio stations in Quintana Roo
Radio stations established in 1984
Chetumal